Pickstown Air Force Station (ADC ID: SM-134, NORAD ID: Z-134) is a closed United States Air Force General Surveillance Radar station. It was closed in 1968.

History
Pickstown Air Force Station was initially part of Phase II of the Air Defense Command Mobile Radar program. The Air Force  approved this expansion of the Mobile Radar program on October 23, 1952.  Radars in this network were designated “SM.”

The station became operational with the activation of the 695th Radar Squadron (SAGE) on 18 April 1961.  The squadron was equipped with AN/FPS-66 and a pair of AN/FPS-6 radars. It fed data to DC-22 at Sioux City AFS, Iowa.  The radar squadron provided information 24/7 the SAGE Direction Center where it was analyzed to determine range, direction altitude speed and whether or not aircraft were friendly or hostile.

The radars were operated until 1968 when Air Defense Command closed the station as part of a draw down of assets and budget reductions.   Today, what was Pickstown AFS has been completely redeveloped.  It is now Fort Randall Casino & Hotel operated by the Yankton Sioux Tribe.

Air Force units and assignments 
Units:
 695th Radar Squadron (SAGE), Activated on 16 April 1961
 Inactivated on 8 September 1968

Assignments:
 Sioux City Air Defense Sector, 16 April 1961
 30th Air Division, 1 April 1966 – 8 September 1968

See also
 List of USAF Aerospace Defense Command General Surveillance Radar Stations

References

  A Handbook of Aerospace Defense Organization 1946 - 1980,  by Lloyd H. Cornett and Mildred W. Johnson, Office of History, Aerospace Defense Center, Peterson Air Force Base, Colorado
 Winkler, David F. (1997), Searching the skies: the legacy of the United States Cold War defense radar program. Prepared for United States Air Force Headquarters Air Combat Command.
 Information for Pickstown AFS, SD

Installations of the United States Air Force in South Dakota
Radar stations of the United States Air Force
Aerospace Defense Command military installations
1961 establishments in South Dakota
1968 disestablishments in South Dakota
Military installations established in 1961
Military installations closed in 1968